Tereza Bábíčková (born 26 March 2003) is a Czech racing driver. She made her debut in W Series in 2022.

Career 
Bábíčková was born on 26 March 2003 in Vracov, Czech Republic. From the age of three, she competed in gymnastics. Bábíčková began karting from the age of six, initially only on weekends with the encouragement of her parents in order to allow her to learn to drive; she subsequently took up karting full-time instead of gymnastics. Bábíčková attended school at the prestigious Open Gate School in Prague, although she did not complete her studies, instead choosing to focus on her developing karting career. She has two sisters (Eliska and Petra Bábíčková) and one brother (Zdenek Bábíček), all three of whom also compete in karting. Bábíčková advanced from karting to open-wheel racing in 2022.

W Series 
From 31 January 2022 to 4 February 2022, Bábíčková competed in a W Series test in Arizona, United States along with 14 other prospective drivers. She then participated in a second pre-season test in Barcelona on 2–4 March along with 11 other potential drivers and 9 automatic qualifiers from the previous W Series season. On 22 March 2022, Bábíčková was confirmed to compete in the 2022 W Series season.

Racing record

Racing career summary 

† As she was a guest driver, Bábíčková was ineligible to score points.

* Season still in progress

Complete W Series results
(key) (Races in bold indicate pole position) (Races in italics indicate fastest lap)

References

External links 
 
 Profile at W Series

Living people
2003 births
W Series drivers
Czech racing drivers
People from Vracov
Sportspeople from the South Moravian Region
Karting World Championship drivers
Formula Regional European Championship drivers
Czech female racing drivers